René Pirolley (17 October 1931 – 26 March 2013) was a French backstroke and butterfly swimmer. He competed at the 1948 Summer Olympics and the 1956 Summer Olympics.

References

External links
 

1931 births
2013 deaths
French male backstroke swimmers
French male butterfly swimmers
Olympic swimmers of France
Swimmers at the 1948 Summer Olympics
Swimmers at the 1956 Summer Olympics
Swimmers from Paris
Swimmers at the 1959 Mediterranean Games